679 Artists (formally known as Sixsevenine and 679 Recordings) was a Warner Music Group-owned record label based in London, England.

It was started by Nick Worthington who after leaving XL Recordings in 2001, started the company with Warner Music Group, and holds the position of MD and A&R Director. It is named "679" as this was the address of the Pure Groove record shop on Holloway Road.

The label's first release was The Streets' debut, Original Pirate Material (which was named The Observers best album of the 2000s).

The label progressed with subsequent albums from artists including Death From Above 1979, The Futureheads, Kano, King Creosote and Mystery Jets, and also included the million-selling second Streets album, A Grand Don't Come for Free.

In 2011, it released Plan B's The Defamation of Strickland Banks which has sold over one million copies.

The founder of 679 has recently formed a new record label called 37 Adventures.

Former artists
 Annie
 Cut Off Your Hands
 Dead Disco
 Death from Above 1979
 The Earlies
 Elro
 Fryars
 The Futureheads
 King Creosote
 Kano
 Little Boots
 Marina
 M. Craft
 MSTRKRFT
 Mystery Jets
 Oh My!
 Plan B
 The Polyphonic Spree
 The Rifles
 Run the Road
 The Secret Handshake
 Secret Machines
 Siren Sirens / Love Letters / Heroine Hearts
 Spark
 The Stills
 The Streets
 The Webb Brothers
 We Smoke Fags
 Wideboys

External links
 Official website

British record labels
Electronic music record labels
Indie rock record labels
Warner Music labels
Record labels established in 2001